Ratk (also Romanized as Rotak) is a village in Khorramdasht Rural District, in the Central District of Kuhbanan County, Kerman Province, Iran. At the 2006 census, its population was 121, in 46 families.

References 

Populated places in Kuhbanan County